"Pick Up the Pieces (To My Heart)" is a Cindy Valentine single co-written with Tony Green and released under Arista Records in 1989. "Pickup the Pieces (To My Heart)" climbed the Dance/Club chart, peaking at No. 11 in a 16-week chart run. "Pickup the Pieces (To My Heart)" was featured in the film, Mannequin Two: On the Move (1991), HBO's feature film, Just Can't Get Enough (2002) and is included on numerous compilation albums.

Personnel 

 Cindy Valentine - Vocals [Lead], backing vocals, keyboards, percussion 
 Tony Green - Vocals, guitar, keyboards 
 Roberto Deus - Keyboards, Drums, Bass [Synth.], Percussion 
 Allan Pernot - Guitar [Solo] 
 Martin Klein - Keyboards
 Martin Klein - Arrangements, engineering (asst.), mixing, programming
 Roberto Deus - Arrangements 
 Marlene Cohen - Art Direction Of Photography
 Carolyn Quan - Artwork [Cover Design]
 Tod - Engineer [Additional] 
 Alberto Tolot - Photography
 Tony Green - Producer, written-by, arrangements musical and vocals, mixing 
 Cindy Valentine - Written-by, vocal arrangements

 Notes 

 Produced for TGO Rocords, Ltd. 
 Pick Up the Pieces (To My Heart) (Extended Version) additional production for Pantera Productions 
 Engineered at Unison Studios, Montreal 
 Additional engineering at Wellesley Sound Studios, Toronto 
 Additional production recorded at Countdown Studios, Miami, FL 
 Remixed at International Sound, Miami

Charts

Vinyl 7"

Vinyl 12"

References

External links 
 Valentine Productions
 

1989 singles
1989 songs
Cindy Valentine songs
Arista Records singles